Druryia is a subgenus within the genus Papilio containing 36 species:

 Papilio andronicus Ward, 1871
 Papilio antimachus Drury, 1782
 Papilio arnoldiana Vane-Wright, 1995
 Papilio charopus Westwood, 1843
 Papilio chitondensis Bivar de Sousa & Fernandes, 1966
 Papilio chrapkowskii Süffert, 1904
 Papilio chrapkowskoides Storace, 1952
 Papilio cynorta Fabricius, 1793
 Papilio cyproeofila Butler, 1868
 Papilio desmondi Van Someren, 1939
 Papilio echerioides Trimen, 1868
 Papilio epiphorbas Boisduval, 1833
 Papilio fernandus Fruhstorfer, 1903
 Papilio filaprae Süffert, 1904
 Papilio fuelleborni Karsch, 1900
 Papilio gallienus Distant, 1879
 Papilio hornimani Distant, 1879
 Papilio interjectana Vane-Wright, 1995
 Papilio jacksoni Sharpe, 1891
 Papilio mackinnoni Sharpe, 1891
 Papilio maesseni Berger, 1974
 Papilio manlius Fabricius, 1798
 Papilio mechowi Dewitz, 1881
 Papilio mechowianus Dewitz, 1885
 Papilio microps Storace, 1952 *
 Papilio nerminae Koçak, 1983
 Papilio nireus Linnaeus, 1758
 Papilio oribazus Boisduval, 1836
 Papilio phorbanta Linnaeus, 1771
 Papilio plagiatus Aurivillius, 1898
 Papilio rex Oberthür, 1886
 Papilio sosia Rothschild & Jordan, 1903
 Papilio thuraui Karsch, 1900
 Papilio ufipa Carcasson, 1961
 Papilio zalmoxis Hewitson, 1864
 Papilio zenobia Fabricius, 1775

References 

Bivar de Sousa, A. & L.F. Mendes 2009: On a new species of the genus Princeps Hübner, [1807] from Cabinda (Angola) (Lepidoptera: Papilionidae). Shilap Revista de Lepidopterologia 37 (147): 327-334.
Turlin, B. & J.-P. Lequeux, 2010: Répartition de Papilio mackinnoni Sharpe, 1891 et description de trois nouvelles sous-espèces (Lepidoptera: Papilionidae). Revue des Lépidoptéristes de France 19: 116-124.

External links 

Papilio
Insect subgenera